Avatharam is a 2014 Indian Malayalam-language action film directed by Joshiy, written by Vyaasan Edavanakadu, and produced by Udaykrishna, Siby K. Thomas, Dileep K. Kunnath, and Vyaasan Edavanakadu. It stars Dileep, Lakshmi Menon, and Sijoy Varghese. The film was released on 1 August 2014.

Plot

This movie is all about the life of Madhavan Mahadevan, who is a social worker from Idukki. He comes to Kochi with sister-in-law and her daughter after the death of his brother Customs Officer Sudhakaran. He is in Cochin to know the mystery behind his brother's death. He visits LIC office claiming the insurance amount of his late brother. Manimekhala is authorised to deal with claims. From the LIC advisor, he realises that his brother's death is a well-planned murder.

He later decides to find the mystery behind the death. Meanwhile, he falls in love with Manimekhala. He discovers that CI Jeevan is involved in the murder. Since then, Madhavan has killed everyone who caused his brother's death. Just before the end of the story, he understands that his brother was murdered by Sri Rama Krishnamoorthy aka SRK, an influential politician with many criminal dealings. ACP Gowtham reaches and takes Moorthy into his custody. Soon receives a  call informing him of a nearby protest. Madhavan kills Moorthy by creating a blast in ACP's car in which Moorthy was handcuffed. Karimban John is killed by his rival. After completing all his revenge, Madhavan takes his now pregnant wife, Manimegala back home.

Cast

 Dileep as Madhavan 
 Lakshmi Menon as Manimekala (Manikutty),  Madhavan's lover turned wife
 Sijoy Varghese as ACP Gautham Viswanath
 Joy Mathew as Karimban John
 Mithun Ramesh as Karimban Joby
 Babu Namboothiri as Sri Ramakrishna Moorthy (S. R. K.)
 Ganesh Kumar as Sudhakaran, Madhavan's Elder brother 
 Sreejaya Nair as Valsala George, Madhavan's sister-in-law and Sudhakaran's wife
 Anju Aravind as Leelamma
 Baby Durga Premjith as Anjali
 Shammi Thilakan as C I Jeevan
 Kannan Pattambi as Karimban Chacko
 Devan as Dr. Mathew Philip
 Janardhanan as Sathyasheelan, Sudhakaran's and Madhavan's father
 Kaviyoor Ponnamma as Sudhakaran's and Madhavan's mother
 Chali Pala as Krishnankutty, Colony secretary
 Nandu Poduval as Pappachan
 Balaji as Bhadran
 Prem Prakash as Narendran, LIC advisor
 Shiju as Jabbar
 V. K. Sreeraman as Hakkim, Jabbar's father
 Major Ravi as Jamal
 Ambika Mohan as Saraswathy
 Valsala Menon as Karimban John's and Joby's mother
 Vinaya Prasad as Karimban John's wife
 Lakshmipriya as Karimban John's and Joby's sister
 Anil Murali as Tipper George
 Lishoy as Ayyappan, Valsala's father
 Gayathry as Valsala's mother
 Ponnamma Babu as Manimeghala's aunt
 Geetha Oommen Mathew as Madhavan's neighbour 
 Majeed as Surendran, Manimeghala's uncle
 Joju George
 Kalabhavan Shajohn as Sundaresan (guest appearance)
 Siddique as Divakaran (guest appearance)
 Shivaji Guruvayoor as Advt. Thomas
 Idavela Babu as Babu, Sundaresan's colleague
 Thesni Khan as Priya

Music

The music of the film is composed by Deepak Dev with lyrics penned by Harinarayan. The music album has two songs:

Release
The film was released on 1 August 2014.

References

External links
 

2014 films
2010s Malayalam-language films
Indian films about revenge
Indian action thriller films
Fictional portrayals of the Kerala Police
Indian gangster films
Films shot in Kochi
Films directed by Joshiy
2014 action thriller films